Kost is a German, Dutch, Polish and Ukrainian surname, either a nickname for a bony angular person from Ukrainian And Czech kost, Slovak kosť or Polish kość "bone" or a residual form of the baptismal name Konstantin. It may refer to:
Eryka Mondry-Kost (1940), Polish gymnast
Joseph Kost (1947), Israeli academic
Nina Kost (1995), Swiss swimmer
R. J. Kost, American politician
Roman Kost (1984), Ukrainian sculptor, master of artistic forging
Thomas Kost (1969), German football manager

References 

German-language surnames
Ukrainian-language surnames
Polish-language surnames
Dutch-language surnames
Surnames from given names
Surnames from nicknames